Holden is a lunar impact crater attached to the southeast rim of the much larger crater Vendelinus. The crater rim is impacted by a craterlet on the north-northwest, and it possesses a terrace along the northeast interior wall. The floor of the crater is flat with no central peak. There is a small crater on the floor just to the south of the midpoint. It is named after Edward Singleton Holden. A crater with the same name exists on Mars.

Satellite craters
By convention these features are identified on lunar maps by placing the letter on the side of the crater midpoint that is closest to Holden.

References

 
 
 
 
 
 
 
 
 
 
 
 

Impact craters on the Moon